Kedarnath Temple (Sanskrit: केदारनाथ मंदिर, IAST: Kēdāranātha Mandira) is a Hindu temple roughly 1200 years old dedicated to Shiva. The temple is located on the Garhwal Himalayan range  
near the Mandakini river, in the state of Uttarakhand, India. Due to extreme weather conditions, the temple is open to the general public only between the months of April (Akshaya Tritiya) and November (Kartik Purnima, the autumn full moon). During the winters, the vigraha (deity) of the temple is carried down to Ukhimath to be worshipped for the next six months. Kedarnath is seen as a homogenous form of Shiva, the 'Lord of Kedarkhand', the historical name of the region.

The temple is not directly accessible by road and has to be reached by a  uphill trek from Gaurikund. Pony, mule and manchan service is available to reach the temple. According to Hindu legends, the temple was initially built by the Pandavas, and is one of the twelve Jyotirlingas, the holiest Hindu shrines of Shiva. The Pandavas were supposed to have pleased Shiva by doing penance in Kedarnath. The temple is one of the four major sites in India's Chota Char Dham pilgrimage of Northern Himalayas and is the first of the Panch Kedar pilgrimage sites. This temple is the highest among the 12 Jyotirlingas. It is one of the 275 paadal petra sthalams expounded in the Tevaram, a sacred Tamil Shaivite text written during the 6th and 7th centuries by 63 saints called Nayanars. This temple is sung of by Thirugnanasambandar, Appar, Sundarar and Sekkizhar in their Tevaram texts.

Kedarnath was the worst affected area during the 2013 flash floods in North India. The temple complex, surrounding areas, and Kedarnath town suffered extensive damage, but the temple structure did not suffer any major damage, apart from a few cracks on one side of the four walls which was caused by the flowing debris from the higher mountains. A large rock among the debris acted as a barrier, protecting the temple from the flood. The surrounding premises and other buildings in the market area were heavily damaged.

History and legends of origin 

It is not certain who built the original Kedarnath temple and when. The name "Kedarnath" means "the lord of the field": it derives from the Sanskrit words kedara ("field") and natha ("lord"). The text Kashi Kedara Mahatmya states that it is so called because "the crop of liberation" grows here.

Many folk legends related to the Garhwal region, Lord Shiva and the creation of the Panch Kedar temples are narrated.

A folk legend about Panch Kedar relates to the Pandavas, the heroes of the Hindu epic Mahabharata. The Pandavas defeated and slew their cousins — the Kauravas in the epic Kurukshetra war. They wished to atone for the sins of committing fratricide (gotra hatya) and Brāhmanahatya (killing of Brahmins — the priest class) during the war. Thus, they handed over the reins of their kingdom to their kin and left in search of lord Shiva and to seek his blessings. First, they went to the holy city of Varanasi (Kashi), believed to be Shiva's favourite city and known for its Kashi Vishwanath Temple. But, Shiva wanted to avoid them as he was deeply incensed by the death and dishonesty at the Kurukshetra war and was, therefore, insensitive to Pandavas' prayers. Therefore, he assumed the form of a bull (Nandi) and hid in the Garhwal region.

Not finding Shiva in Varanasi, the Pandavas went to Garhwal Himalayas. Bhima, the second of the five Pandava brothers, then standing astride two mountains started to look for Shiva. He saw a bull grazing near Guptakashi ("hidden Kashi" — the name derived from the hiding act of Shiva). Bhima immediately recognized the bull to be Shiva. Bhima caught hold of the bull by its tail and hind legs. But the bull-formed Shiva disappeared into the ground to later reappear in parts, with the hump raising in Kedarnath, the arms appearing in Tungnath, the face showing up at Rudranath, the nabhi (navel) and stomach surfacing in Madhyamaheshwar and the hair appearing in Kalpeshwar. The Pandavas pleased with this reappearance in five different forms, built temples at the five places for venerating and worshipping Shiva.

A variant of the tale credits Bhima of not only catching the bull, but also stopping it from disappearing. Consequently, the bull was torn asunder into five parts and appeared at five locations in the Kedar Khand of Garhwal region of the Himalayas. After building the Panch Kedar Temples, the Pandavas meditated at Kedarnath for salvation, performed yagna (fire sacrifice) and then through the heavenly path called the Mahapanth (also called Swargarohini), attained heaven or salvation.. The Panch Kedar Temples are constructed in the North-Indian Himalayan Temple architecture with the Kedarnath, Tungnath and Madhyamaheshwar temples looking similar.

After completing the pilgrimage of Lord Shiva's darshan at the Panch Kedar Temples, it is an unwritten religious rite to visit Lord Vishnu at the Badrinath Temple, as a final affirmatory proof by the devotee that he has sought blessings of Lord Shiva.

The Mahabharata, which gives the account of the Pandavas and the Kurukshetra War, does not mention any place called Kedarnath. One of the earliest references to Kedarnath occurs in the Skanda Purana (c. 7th-8th century), which contains a story describing the origin of the Ganges river. The text names Kedara (Kedarnath) as the place where Shiva released the holy water from his matted hair.

According to the hagiographies based on Madhava's Sankshepa-shankara-vijaya, the 8th century philosopher Adi Shankara died at the mountains near Kedarnath; although other hagiographies, based on Anandagiri's Prachina-Shankara-Vijaya, state that he died at Kanchipuram. The ruins of a monument marking the purported death place of Shankara are located at Kedarnath. Kedarnath was definitely a prominent pilgrimage centre by the 12th century, when it is mentioned in Kritya-kalpataru written by the Gahadavala minister Bhatta Lakshmidhara.

Kedarnath Teerth Purohits are the ancient Brahmins of this region, their ancestors (Rishi-Muni) have been worshiping the lingam since the time of Nara-Narayana and Daksh Prajapati. King Janmejay, grandson of the Pandavas, gave them the right of worshiping this temple and donate the whole Kedar region, and they have been worshiping pilgrims ever since.

According to a tradition recorded by the English mountaineer Eric Shipton (1926), "many hundreds of years ago" one priest used to hold services at both the Kedarnath and Badrinath temples, travelling between the two places daily.

The temple

There is a small pillared hall in front of the temple, that has images of Parvati and of the five Pandava princes. There are four temples around  Kedarnath itself, namely- Tungnath, Rudranath, Madhyamaheshwar and Kalpeshwar which form the Panch Kedar pilgrimage sites. The first hall inside Kedarnath Temple contains statues of the five Pandava brothers, Krishna, Nandi, the vehicle of Shiva and Virabhadra, one of the guards of Shiva. Statues of Draupadi and other deities are also installed in the main hall. An unusual feature of the temple is the head of a man carved in the triangular stone lingam. Such a head is seen carved in another temple nearby constructed on the site where the marriage of Shiva and Parvati was held. Adi Shankara was believed to have revived this temple, along with Badrinath and other temples of Uttarakhand; he is believed to have attained Mahasamadhi at Kedarnath. Behind the temple is the samādhi mandir of Adi Sankara.

The head priest (Raval) of the Kedarnath temple belongs to the Veerashaiva community from Karnataka. However, unlike in Badrinath temple, the Raval of Kedarnath temple does not perform the pujas. The pujas are carried out by Raval's assistants on his instructions. The Raval moves with the deity to Ukhimath during the winter season. There are five main priests for the temple, and they become head priests for one year by rotation. The present (2013) Raval of Kedarnath temple is Shri Vageesha Lingacharya from Davanagere district, Karnataka. Surrounding Kedarnath, there are many symbols of the Pandavas. Raja Pandu died at Pandukeshwar. The tribals here perform a dance called "Pandav Lila". The mountain top where the Pandavas went to Swarga, is known as "Swargarohini", which is located off Badrinath. When Yudhishtira, the eldest of the Pandavas, was leaving for the heaven, one of his fingers fell on the earth. At that place, Yudhishtira installed a Shiva Linga, which is the size of the thumb. To gain Mashisharupa, Lord Shiva and Bheema fought with maces. Bheema was struck with remorse. He started to massage Shiva's body with ghee. In memory of this event, even today, this triangular Shiva lingam is massaged with ghee. Water and bilva-patra leaves are used for worship.

Administration

The temple was included in the Uttar Pradesh State Government Act No. 30/1948 as Act no. 16,1939, which came to be known as Shri Badarinath and Shri Kedarnath Mandir Act. The committee nominated by the state government administers both temples. The act was modified in 2002 by the Uttarakhand State Government, which provisioned adding additional committee members including government officials and a vice-chairman. There are a total of seventeen members in the board; three selected by the Uttarakhand Legislative Assembly, one member each selected by the District Councils of Chamoli, Pauri Garhwal, Tehri Garhwal and Uttarkashi districts, and ten members nominated by the Government of Uttarakhand. On the religious side, there is a Rawal (chief priest) and three other priests: Naib Rawal, Acharya/Dharmadhikari and Vedpathi. The administrative structure of the temple consists of a chief executive officer who executes the orders from the state government. A deputy chief executive officer, two OSDs, an executive officer, an account officer, a temple officer and a publicity officer assist the chief executive officer.

Connectivity
Nearest Airport: Dehradun

Nearest Railway Station: Rishikesh

2013 floods

The Kedarnath valley, along with other parts of the state of Uttarakhand, was hit with unprecedented flash floods on 16 and 17 June 2013. On 16 June, at about 7:30 p.m. a landslide and mudslides occurred near Kedarnath Temple with loud peals of thunder. An enormously loud peal was heard and huge amounts of water started gushing from Chorabari Tal or Gandhi Tal down Mandakini river at about 8:30 p.m. washing everything away in its path. On 17 June 2013 at about 6:40 a.m. waters again started cascading at a huge speed from river Swaraswati and Chorabari Tal or Gandhi Tal bringing along with its flow huge amount of silt, rocks, and boulders. A huge rock got stuck behind Kedarnath Temple and protected it from the ravages of the flood. The waters gushed on both the sides of the temple destroying everything in their path. Even eyewitness observed that one large rock got carried to the rear side of Kedarnath Temple, thus causing obstruction to the debris, diverting the flow of river and debris to the sides of the temple avoiding damage. The rock which protected the temple is worshipped as the God's Rock (भीम शीला).

Another theory for the temple not being destroyed is because of its construction. Although the temple withstood the severity of the floods, the complex and surrounding area were destroyed, resulting in the death of hundreds of pilgrims and locals. Shops and hotels in Kedarnath were destroyed and all roads were broken. People took shelter inside the temple for several hours, until the Indian Army airlifted them to safer places. The Uttarakhand Chief Minister announced that the Kedarnath shrine would remain closed for a year for clearing the debris.

The experts, who were asked by the Archaeological Survey of India to examine the condition of the foundation in wake of the floods have arrived at the conclusion that there was no danger to the temple. The IIT Madras experts visited the temple thrice for the purpose. Non-destructive testing instruments that do not disturb the structure of the temple were used by the IIT-team for assessing the health of the structure, foundation, and walls. They have submitted their interim report that the temple is stable and there was no major danger.

Nehru Institute of Mountaineering (NIM) was given the responsibility of rebuilding Kedarnath. Although the institute did not have the expertise in urban planning or construction, they mastered in high altitude training. Under the leadership of veteran mountaineer, Colonel Ajay Kothiyal, NIM rigorously worked for a year and made the pilgrimage yatra possible from the next year.

See also
Adi Shankara
Badrinath Temple
Gangotri Temple
Gaurikund
Jyotirlinga
Yamunotri Temple
Chota Char Dham
Panch Kedar

References

Further reading

External links

 Official website
 Kedarnath - Uttarakhand Tourism
 Photos 2013 floods -a big Rock behind temple

Shiva temples in Uttarakhand
Jyotirlingas
Chota Char Dham temples
Panch Kedar
Rudraprayag district
Padal Petra Stalam